This is a list of the transfers for the 2012–13 A-League season. This list includes transfers featuring at least one A-League club. Promotions from youth squads to the first squad of the same club are not included.

 Brackets around club names indicate the player's contract with that club had expired making him a Free agent before he signed for a new club.

  Injury replacement contract
  Player will officially join his club on 14 January 2013

See also
For transfers related to next season see: A-League transfers for 2013–14 season

References

External links
A-League official website

A-League Men transfers
transfers
Football transfers summer 2012
Football transfers winter 2012–13